The Amazing Dr. Clitterhouse is a 1936 thriller play by the British writer Barré Lyndon. The lead character's name is a play on the term for the female sexual organ the clitoris - a name characterised by the "yearning, untrammelled nature" of Clitterhouse himself; an extremely daring pun for 1936, yet seemingly anticipated by Lyndon to escape the notice of the contemporary censor. "My view was that he was no more likely to locate the pun in my title as to locate the source of it on his beloved bedfellow", Lyndon 'Fragment of Autobiography'.

The play premiered at the Haymarket Theatre in London's West End and ran for 491 performances. The original cast included Ralph Richardson. In 1937 it transferred to Broadway with Cedric Hardwicke in the leading role.

Film adaptation
The screen rights to the play were acquired by Warner Bros. who adapted it into a film version of the same title directed by Anatole Litvak and starring Edward G. Robinson, Claire Trevor and Humphrey Bogart. It shifted the location of the action from London to New York.

References

Bibliography
 Kabatchnik, Amnon. Blood on the Stage, 1925-1950: Milestone Plays of Crime, Mystery, and Detection : an Annotated Repertoire. Scarecrow Press, 2010.
 Wearing, J.P. The London Stage 1930-1939: A Calendar of Productions, Performers, and Personnel.  Rowman & Littlefield, 2014.

1936 plays
Thriller plays
West End plays
British plays adapted into films
Plays by Barré Lyndon